Diego Nargiso defeated Jason Stoltenberg in the final, 7–6(8–6), 6–4 to win the boys' singles tennis title at the 1987 Wimbledon Championships.

Seeds

 n/a
  Jim Courier (semifinals)
  Shane Barr (quarterfinals)
  Diego Nargiso (champion)
  Martin Blackman (first round)
  Jason Stoltenberg (final)
  Eugenio Rossi (third round)
  Todd Woodbridge (third round)
  Nicolás Pereira (second round)
  David Wheaton (third round)
  Nuno Marques (first round)
  Brett Steven (third round)
  Byron Black (quarterfinals)
 n/a
  Marcus Barbosa (semifinals)
  Gustavo Carbonari (second round)

Draw

Finals

Top half

Section 1

Section 2

Bottom half

Section 3

Section 4

References

External links

Boys' Singles
Wimbledon Championship by year – Boys' singles